Built in 1949, the opposed-piston 2-10-4 was one of a number of Soviet locomotive designs that was unsuccessful. The cylinders were placed above the center driving axle. Unlike nearly all steam locomotives, the pistons had rods on both ends which transferred power to the wheels. The idea was to balance the driving forces on the wheels, allowing the counterweights on the wheels to be smaller and reducing "hammer blow" on the track. The locomotive was never repeated and the design was a failure. The locomotive was never used for more than testing and was returned to its builder, the Voroshilovgrad Works, and scrapped sometime afterward.

See also
 History of rail transport in Russia
 Russian Railway Museum, Saint Petersburg

External links 
 Russian Reforms - Describes this and other Russian locomotive types

ОР23
2-10-4 locomotives
Luhanskteplovoz locomotives
5 ft gauge locomotives
Railway locomotives introduced in 1949